The Grass Is Greener is a 1960 British romantic comedy film directed by Stanley Donen and starring Cary Grant, Deborah Kerr, Robert Mitchum, and Jean Simmons. The screenplay was adapted by Hugh Williams and Margaret Vyner from the play of the same name which they had written and found success with in London's West End.

Plot
Victor and Hilary, the Earl and Countess of Rhyall, are dealing with the financial difficulties of owning a large English country house and estate in twentieth century Britain when inheritance taxes have taken a toll on their financial situation. Like many other such estates, they have opened up their house for guided tours for the public at two shillings and sixpence per person.

Charles Delacro ignores a large "Private" sign on the door and barges into the private quarters, finding Hilary. At first annoyed, her behaviour is transformed when he introduces himself and mentions that he is a millionaire American oil tycoon. While making conversation about the house, and despite knowing that she is married, he makes very clear his attraction to her and his intentions towards her. In fact, his attraction to her is reciprocated, but Hilary is clearly discomfited by realising that Charles knows this. Charles invites her to visit him at the Savoy hotel in London where he is staying, making no pretensions about the fact that he is asking her to have an affair with him. When Victor suddenly enters the room, he notices his wife's attitude, and treats Charles with exaggerated courtesy.

That evening, Hilary makes an appointment with her hairdresser in London for early next day, explaining to Victor that she will have to stay overnight with their friend Hattie Durant. Rather than behave jealously, Victor tells her the times of the trains she can catch and affects not to know the real reason for her trip. Meanwhile, Charles has tracked down Hilary’s hairdresser and appointment, and next day he is outside waiting when she leaves. They go back to Charles’ hotel room and into the bedroom.

Next day, Hilary does not return home, but Hattie does arrive, an ex-girlfriend of Victor's who still carries a torch for him, and she tells him about Hilary and Charles’ affair. Victor phones his hotel to ask Charles to visit and he accepts, against Hilary’s wishes, and even offers to give her a lift back from London.

When they arrive next day, Victor is determined to remain civilized at all times and acts as if he does not know that his wife is having an affair with Charles. The two men go fishing together and Victor tells Charles he knows about the affair and that he feels a compulsion to defend his honour, and therefore challenges Charles to a duel, which Charles feels he cannot refuse. In a long corridor in the mansion, they go through with it, firing once apiece, with Victor wounded in the arm while Charles is unharmed. It is later revealed that both men fired to miss, as Victor expected Charles would do, while Sellers, the family butler, an ex-army man and an expert shot, wounded Victor with a weapon of his own.

When the women find out, Hilary cannot bring herself to leave her loving husband for Delacro who drives off, taking Hattie with him.

Cast
 Cary Grant as Victor, Earl of Rhyall
 Deborah Kerr as Hilary, Countess of Rhyall
 Robert Mitchum as Charles Delacro
 Jean Simmons as Hattie Durant
 Moray Watson as Trevor Sellers, the Butler

Casting
Roy Ward Baker wanted to make the film at Rank and tried to get the rights.

Originally Cary Grant turned down the role of Victor. Afterwards the role was subsequently offered to his friend Rex Harrison and he accepted. However right before production began, Harrison's wife Kay Kendall fell gravely ill and he was forced to leave the production in order to tend to her. Grant, out of respect for cast and crew, and to keep the filming running according to schedule, decided then to finally take the part.

It was originally intended by director Stanley Donen that Cary Grant would play the part of Delacro, the American tourist, while Rex Harrison and Kay Kendall were respectively cast as "Victor Rhyall" and "Hattie". But Kendall died soon after completing an earlier Donen film, Once More, with Feeling!, and Harrison dropped out of the film because of this. Cary Grant agreed to play Victor instead of Delacro, and both Rock Hudson and Charlton Heston were approached about playing the American character. Both refused, and Robert Mitchum was cast quite late in the proceedings, making no fuss at all about taking third-billing. Cary Grant often claimed this had "saved the film" and praised his performance highly.

Most of the cast had worked together a  number of times before. It was the third of four movies that paired Deborah Kerr and Robert Mitchum, the third time Jean Simmons had worked with Kerr and Mitchum, and Cary Grant's third collaboration with Deborah Kerr. They had previously worked together on Dream Wife (1953) and An Affair to Remember (1957).

Moray Watson was the only member of the original stage cast to be retained for the film version.

Set design
British interior decorator Felix Harbord served as the film's special consultant for settings. Osterley Park was used as the location for the stately home.

Reception
While the film was a moderate success at the UK box office, it was a box office bomb in the United States. It was reviewed positively by critics and has since developed a following and has been a staple of American cable television. At the time of its release, Jean Simmons's performance as a madcap heiress earned some praise and a Laurel Award nomination.

References

External links
 

1960 films
1960 romantic comedy films
British films based on plays
British romantic comedy films
Films directed by Stanley Donen
Films set in country houses
1960s English-language films
1960s British films